Claude Dubaële (born 19 January 1940) is a French former professional football player and coach. He played for Stade Reims, Rennes, Angers SCO, Lille OSC and Le Mans. He was also part of France's squad at the 1960 Summer Olympics.

After retiring as a player, Dubaële enjoyed a career as a manager with Fossemange, Rennes and Red Star 93.

References

1940 births
Living people
People from Lens, Pas-de-Calais
French footballers
Stade de Reims players
Stade Rennais F.C. players
Angers SCO players
Lille OSC players
Le Mans FC players
Ligue 1 players
Ligue 2 players
Olympic footballers of France
Footballers at the 1960 Summer Olympics
French football managers
Stade Rennais F.C. managers
Red Star F.C. managers
Association football midfielders
Association football forwards
Sportspeople from Pas-de-Calais
Footballers from Hauts-de-France